This is a list of the main churches and monasteries in Albania.

Churches
765 churches and monasteries were destroyed by communist authorities in 1967 when state atheism was first introduced in the country.

Monasteries

See also
 List of cathedrals in Albania
 List of Roman Catholic dioceses in Albania

References 

Albania
Churches
 
 
Churches